The 2nd Armoured Brigade is an armoured brigade of the French Army. It is heir to the honours and traditions of the 2nd Armoured Division famously commanded by Philippe Leclerc de Hauteclocque.

In 1970 the 2nd Armoured Brigade at Saint-Germain-en-Laye was part of the 8th Armoured Division, headquartered at Compiègne, alongside two mechanised brigades. In 1977 the 2nd Armoured Brigade appears to have been disbanded, and the 2nd Armoured Division reformed.

The reorganisation of the French Army in 1999 transformed and downsized the 2nd Armoured Division to the 2nd Armoured Brigade.

From 1999 to 2010 the brigade headquarters was located in the quartier Bellecombe in Orléans.

From July 2010 the brigade headquarters was located in Illkirch-Graffenstaden, neighbouring Strasbourg, at the quartier Leclerc (near the 2e Compagnie de Commandement et de Transmissions and the 291st Jäger Bataillon). The general commanding the brigade is at the same time the Military Governor of Strasbourg. He loges in the :fr:Palais du Gouverneur militaire de Strasbourg situated in the place Broglie in Strasbourg.

Structure 2016
The brigade consists of seven regiments.

 2 Compagnie de Commandement et de Transmissions (2 CCT) – Command and Signals Company in Illkirch-Graffenstaden with Véhicule de l'Avant Blindé (VAB)
 12 Régiment de Cuirassiers (12 RC) – Armoured Regiment in Olivet with 60 AMX-56 Leclerc main battle tanks
 501e Régiment de chars de combat (501 RCC) – Armoured Regiment in Mourmelon-le-Grand with 60 Leclerc
 Régiment de Marche du Tchad (RMT) – Marine Infantry Regiment in Meyenheim with VBCI
 16 Bataillon de Chasseurs (16 BC) – Infantry Battalion in Bitche with VBCI
 92 Régiment d'Infanterie (92 RI) – Infantry Regiment in Clermont-Ferrand with VBCI
 40 Régiment d'Artillerie (40 RA) Self-propelled Howitzer Regiment in Suippes with 32 GCT 155mm and 12 120mm mortars
 13 Régiment du Génie (13 RG) – Engineer Regiment in Valdahon

Other units include:
 Batterie de renseignement brigade de Suippes
"Centre de formation initial des militaires du rang, le Bataillon de renfort de la 2e Brigade blindée" (CFIM, BR 2BB), dépositaire des traditions of the 12th Régiment of the Chasseurs d'Afrique.

Notes

References
www.defense.gouv.fr

External links
Official site  – 2 BB

Armoured Brigade, 2nd
Military units and formations established in 1999
1999 establishments in France